K. Rajagopal (born 21 September 1965) is a Singaporean film director and screenwriter. He co-wrote and directed the social drama film A Yellow Bird, which was selected to be screened at the International Critics' Week, 2016 Cannes Film Festival. 

Before he found filmmaking, he worked in the hotel industry and was also teaching in a school for mentally-challenged people. Besides filmmaking, he has also worked onstage and collaborated with many notable theatre directors on projects such as Medea, Mother Courage and Beauty World. He performed as King Lear in The King Lear Project at the Kunstenfestivaldesarts in Brussels and at the Singapore Arts Festival in 2008, after an 11-year hiatus. In 2009, he played Faust in Film Faust for the Esplanade Presents Series. His entry into filmmaking is a direct result of being a 'frustrated actor' in the theatre world who was unable to get lead roles as a result of being a minority race in Singapore.  

He calls himself a late bloomer and encourages other students to chase after their dreams.

Filmography

References

External links
 

1965 births
Living people
Singaporean film directors
Singaporean screenwriters